The Municipality of Šentjur, named Municipality of Šentjur pri Celju until 2002, is a municipality in eastern Slovenia. The town of Šentjur is the seat of the municipality. With an area of  it is one of the larger municipalities in Slovenia. The area is part of the traditional region of Styria. The municipality is now included in the Savinja Statistical Region. Saint George appears on the municipal coat of arms.

Settlements
In addition to the municipal seat of Šentjur, the municipality also includes the following settlements:

 Bezovje pri Šentjurju
 Bobovo pri Ponikvi
 Boletina
 Botričnica
 Brdo
 Brezje ob Slomu
 Bukovje pri Slivnici
 Cerovec
 Črnolica
 Dobje pri Lesičnem
 Dobovec pri Ponikvi
 Dobrina
 Dole
 Dolga Gora
 Doropolje
 Dramlje
 Drobinsko
 Golobinjek pri Planini
 Gorica pri Slivnici
 Goričica
 Grobelno (Šentjur portion)*
 Grušce
 Hotunje
 Hrastje
 Hruševec
 Hrušovje
 Jakob pri Šentjurju
 Jarmovec
 Javorje
 Jazbin Vrh
 Jazbine
 Jelce
 Kalobje
 Kameno
 Kostrivnica
 Košnica
 Krajnčica
 Krivica
 Laze pri Dramljah
 Loka pri Žusmu
 Lokarje
 Loke pri Planini
 Lopaca
 Lutrje
 Marija Dobje
 Okrog
 Osredek
 Ostrožno pri Ponikvi
 Paridol
 Planina pri Sevnici
 Planinca
 Planinska Vas
 Planinski Vrh
 Pletovarje
 Podgaj
 Podgrad
 Podlešje
 Podlog pod Bohorjem
 Podpeč nad Marofom
 Podpeč pri Šentvidu
 Podvine
 Ponikva
 Ponkvica
 Prapretno
 Primož pri Šentjurju
 Proseniško
 Rakitovec
 Razbor
 Repno
 Rifnik
 Sele
 Slatina pri Ponikvi
 Slivnica pri Celju
 Sotensko pod Kalobjem
 Spodnje Slemene
 Srževica
 Stopče
 Straška Gorca
 Straža na Gori
 Svetelka
 Šedina
 Šentvid pri Planini
 Šibenik
 Tajhte
 Tratna ob Voglajni
 Tratna pri Grobelnem
 Trno
 Trnovec pri Dramljah
 Trška Gorca
 Turno
 Uniše
 Vejice
 Vezovje
 Visoče
 Vodice pri Kalobju
 Vodice pri Slivnici
 Vodruž
 Voduce
 Vodule
 Voglajna
 Vrbno
 Zagaj pri Ponikvi
 Zalog pod Uršulo
 Zgornje Selce
 Zgornje Slemene
 Zlateče pri Šentjurju
 Žegar

*Because the settlement of Grobelno straddles two municipalities, it appears on this list as well as the Municipality of Šmarje pri Jelšah list

References

External links
 
 Šentjur municipal website

 
Sentjur
Municipality of Sentjur